Crystal Beach may refer to one of the following locations:

Crystal Beach, Ontario, community in Fort Erie, Ontario
Crystal Beach Park, amusement park in Crystal Beach, Ontario from 1888 to 1989
Crystal Beach (Nepean), community located in Ottawa, Ontario
Crystal Beach, Texas, historical beachfront near Galveston Bay, Texas
Crystal Beach (Florida), unincorporated community and a beach located in Pinellas County, Florida
White Crystal Beach, Maryland, unincorporated beach community in Cecil County, Maryland